The Welsh Rugby Union (WRU) is the governing body of rugby union in the country of Wales, recognised by the sport's international governing body, World Rugby.

The WRU is responsible for the running of rugby in Wales, overseeing 320 member clubs, the Welsh national team and National Leagues and Cups. The WRU is headed by the President (Gerald Davies), chairman (Ieuan Evans) and acting CEO (Nigel Walker).

History

The roots of the Welsh Rugby Union lay in the creation of the South Wales Football Union (SWFU) in September 1875; formed, "...with the intention of playing matches with the principal clubs in the West of England and the neighbourhood. The rugby rules will be the code adopted. The South Wales Football Club was superseded in 1878 by the South Wales Football Union in an attempt to bring greater regulation to the sport and to select representatives from club sides to represent the international game. The SWFU though were poorly organised, and although they arranged fixtures between a South Wales team and various English clubs, they were often victims of fixture-clashes and were accused of lacking energy. In 1880, Richard Mullock, secretary of the Newport Athletic Club, decided to take matters into his own hands and without the backing of the SWFU organised an international match against England.

The match took place on 19 February 1881, and was won by England seven goals, one dropped goal and six tries to nil. This heavy defeat lay the seeds for further reforms that would lead to the creation of the WRU.

Currently, there is confusion regarding the official date of creation of the Welsh Rugby Union. In March 1880 nine teams supposedly met at the Tenby Hotel, Swansea with the intent of creating a new union. These teams are thought to have been, Cardiff RFC, Chepstow RFC, Haverfordwest RFC, Llandaff RFC, Llanelli RFC, Neath RFC, Newport RFC, Pontypridd RFC and Swansea RFC. The issue with accepting this meeting is that there is no written evidence, just oral repetition.

On 12 March 1881, eleven clubs met in the Castle Hotel, Neath to form what would be accepted as a Welsh rugby union. After a humiliating defeat in the first Wales international rugby game, the Neath meeting was organised by Mullock to form a union that could organise regular international matches. The founding clubs of the Welsh Football Union (WFU), as it was originally known, were Swansea C & FC, Pontypool RFC, Newport RFC, Merthyr RFC, Llanelli RFC, Bangor RFC, Brecon RFC, Cardiff RFC, Lampeter RFC, Llandovery RFC and Llandeilo RFC. Strangely the oldest rugby club in Wales, Neath RFC are not recorded as being present, even though the meeting took place in the town of Neath. It is unknown if this was an oversight by the committee to record the presence of the club, or if Neath RFC actually did not attend. The fact that two of the main committee members of the SWFU, John Llewellyn and Sam Clark were Neath men, and the creation of the WFU disbanded their union, is generally accepted as the reason for the absence of a Neath representative.

The WRU was a founding member of the International Rugby Football Board, now known as World Rugby, in 1886 with Scotland and Ireland, with Mullock and Horace Lyne the Welsh representatives at the formal signing of the union in 1887.

It was not until 1934 that the current name, the Welsh Rugby Union, was adopted.

Responsibilities

The WRU are responsible for the running of Welsh rugby, including 320 member clubs, the Welsh national team and National Leagues and Cups. The Welsh Rugby Union has a major role in the development of coaches, referees and players throughout all ages for both men and women. They also own the home of Welsh rugby union, the 74,500 capacity Millennium Stadium, Cardiff, "an icon of the modern Wales".

After the national team the next highest level of representation in Wales is the four regions based around top club sides, but representing a larger area. These regions came into being in 2003 when the WRU elected to reduce the current top tier of Welsh professional rugby union from nine clubs into five regions modelled on the successful Irish provinces and the Super Rugby franchises in South Africa, Australia and New Zealand. The WRU had hoped to reduce the teams to four regions but Cardiff and Llanelli successfully argued for stand-alone status. After one year the Celtic Warriors region was closed down and the four surviving regional clubs are Cardiff Blues, Scarlets, Ospreys and Newport Gwent Dragons. They play in the Pro14, European Professional Club Rugby (Champions Cup and Challenge Cup) and Anglo-Welsh Cup competitions. Each region may call up players from a set of club teams within their area. These top club sides play in the 14-strong Welsh Premier Division.

In August 2008 WRU chief Roger Lewis confirmed that the body was looking at a proposal to reinstate a fifth Welsh region, based in North Wales. Lewis admitted that he regretted the decision in 2004 to close down Celtic Warriors. In September 2008 a new North Wales Rugby development team was announced, likely to be based in Wrexham; ultimately, the team was launched as RGC 1404, and was to be based in Colwyn Bay instead of Wrexham. In the same month Llanelli Scarlets changed their name to simply Scarlets, believing the new name would better represent their region beyond Llanelli.

Rugby Services Agreement
The current Rugby Services Agreement (or RSA) has been in place since 28 August 2014, and will be in place between the union and the four Welsh regions (Cardiff Blues, Newport Gwent Dragons, Ospreys and Scarlets) for six years. The RSA delivers £8.7million a year to the Regions guaranteed to be spent on Welsh qualified players with a complex matrix of funding, also guaranteeing a further £3.6million in loan facilities from the WRU repayable during the term of the RSA. Each Region also receives a one-off £500,000 payment on signature of the new RSA.

The new agreement also allows players to be offered a National Dual Contract (NDC), which means the union will pay 60% of a NDC player's salary and their region 40%. They also become available for all Welsh senior matches, despite if the match falls outside World Rugby's international release windows in June and November. The WRU retained the right to play up to 13 senior international games each year with a 13-day release facility for squad training before the Six Nations and Autumn series games. The new agreement does state that the national team head coach, currently Wayne Pivac, will be the sole person to decide who gets a National Dual Contract, with a long-term aim of only selecting players based in Wales. The limit on foreign players in Regional squads has been capped at a maximum of six while each Region will be allowed two so-called time serving players who will be available for Welsh selection after three years residency (rising to five years, effective from 31 December 2020).

Criticism
In 2008 the Welsh Language Society wrote to the WRU outlining a "lack of commitment to the Welsh language" and later held meetings to discuss the matter. In a statement to BBC Wales, a WRU spokesman said that it was reviewing its website and would be having more Welsh on the site.

The current logo of the Welsh Rugby Union is based on the Prince of Wales's feathers. There have been multiple calls for the WRU to use a logo "more relevant to Wales" as the feathers are associated by some with the "English crown". Pro-independence group YesCymru created mock-up WRU logos using a leek, daffodil and harp instead of the three feathers. Using a Welsh dragon has also been proposed.

The union's patron is Prince William, the current Prince of Wales. The naming of the Prince William Cup caused controversy in Wales in 2007, with petitions receiving more than 1,000 signatures calling for it to be named after the late Ray Gravell instead.

Misogyny, homophobia and racism 
In January 2023, a BBC Wales investigation included multiple former WRU employees who made allegations of a "toxic culture" in the workplace of the WRU. Later that week, Steve Phillips resigned as the chief executive officer of the WRU and was replaced by Nigel Walker. WRU chair Ieuan Evans said that an external taskforce would be established to deal with the allegations.

In response to this news, Plaid Cymru Senedd member, Heledd Fychan said:

“Steve Phillips’ position was untenable, and I welcome today’s news that he has stepped aside. It is the right action to take after the abject failure of the WRU to date to deal with very serious allegations of misogyny and sexism that were seemingly known to him and others.

“Nigel Walker’s appointment as Acting CEO must signal the beginning and not the end of the significant structural and cultural changes needed at the WRU.

“The Welsh Government should now consider whether it is appropriate for the WRU to receive any further public money until these changes are made. We need certainty that women are safe from horrific misogyny in rugby, as well as across society.”

Ieuan Evans is set to answer questions on the matter at the Senedd on 2 February 2023 from the Senedd’s Culture, Communications, Welsh Language, Sport, and International Relations Committee.

Principals

Presidents
Cyril Chambers (1881(March)–1881(Sept.))
Victor Albert George Child Villiers, 7th Earl of Jersey (1881(Sept)–1885)
Sir J.T.D. Llewellyn (1885–1906)
Horace Lyne MBE (1906–1947)
Sir David Rocyn-Jones CBE (1947–1953)
Ernest Davies (1953–1954)
W.R. Thomas MBE (1954–1955)
Major T.H. Vile MBE (1955–1956)
Glyn Stephens (1956–1957)
Enoch H. Rees (1957–1958)
F.G. Phillips (1958–1959)
Lt. Col. P.R. Howells (1959–1960)
D. Hopkin Thomas (1960–1961)
D.E. Davies (1961–1962)
Wilf Faull MBE (1962–1963)
D. Ewart Davies (1963–1964)
Nathan Rocyn-Jones (1964–1965)
David Jones (1965–1966)
T.C. Prosser (1966–1967)
Glyn Morgan (1967–1968)
Ivor E. Jones CBE (1968–1969)
V.C. Phelps (1969–1970)
Kenneth Morgan Harris CBE (1970–1971)
Rhys E. Williams (1971–1972)
Vernon J. Parfitt (1972–1973)
Leslie M. Spence MBE (1973–1974)
Harry Bowcott (1974–1975)
Handel C. Rogers (1975–1976)
Hywel Thomas (1976–1977)
T. Rowley Jones (1977–1978)
D. Luther James (1978–1979)
Gwyn Roblin (1979–1980)
Cliff Jones OBE (1980–1981)
Osmond John OBE (1981–1982)
Hermas Evans (1982–1983)
Eirwyn Davies (1983–1984)
Kenneth Gwilym (1984–1985)
Alun Thomas (1985–1986)
Desmond Barnett (1986–1987)
W. George Morgan (1987–1988)
Myrddin Jones (1988–1989)
Clive Rowlands (1989–1990)
G.J. Treharne (1990–1991)
Ieuan Evans (1991–1992)
Graham Tregidon (1992–1993)
Sir Tasker Watkins (1993–2004)
Keith Rowlands (2004–2006(Nov.))
Glanmor Griffiths (2007(May)- 2007 Oct)
 Dennis Gethin (2007 to 2019)
Gerald Davies (2019–present)
Ray Rowlands RTB RFC (2019–present)

Secretaries
Richard Mullock (1881–1892)
W.H. Gwynn (1892–1896)
Walter E. Rees (1896–1948)
Eric Evans (1948–1955)
William H. Clement OBE (1956–1981)
Ray Williams OBE (1981–1988)
David East (1989)
Denis Evans (1990–1993)
Edward Jones (1993–1996)
Richard Jasinski (1996–1997)
Dennis Gethin (1998–2002)
Position no longer exists

Honorary Treasurers
Richard Mullock (1881–1891)
William H. Wilkins (1891–1903)
T.R. Griffiths (1903–1930)
Sam West (1930–1934)
Eric Roberts (1934–1945)
P.O. Evans (1946–1952)
Kenneth Morgan Harris (1952–1982)
Glanmor Griffiths (1984–2003)
Studid Lee (Beaufort RFC)
2003 Position terminated.

See also 
 Wales national rugby union team
 Rugby union in Wales
 History of rugby union
 United Rugby Championship
 Welsh Premier Division
 WRU Challenge Cup
 WRU National Leagues
 Welsh Rugby Players Association

Bibliography

References

External links
 

Rugby union in Wales
Sports governing bodies in Wales
Organisations based in Cardiff
Rugby union governing bodies in Europe
1881 establishments in Wales
World Rugby members
Sports organizations established in 1881